The Gretsch 6128 (Duo Jet) is a chambered solid body electric guitar manufactured by Gretsch since the mid-1950s.

Origins
The Duo Jet was first introduced in 1953, after the success of the Gibson Les Paul Goldtop. A key difference between the two was that the Duo Jet was not a solid-body, instead being semi-solid with routed channels and pockets inside.

It is believed that the name Duo Jet was inspired by the fact that the guitar has two pickups (Duo) and by the advanced aircraft of the time (Jet). This was the first Gretsch guitar to feature a truss rod accessible through the headstock, a pickup selection switch on the cutaway, and a master volume on the body.

Construction
Made of a chambered mahogany body, one of the most notable differences between the Duo Jet and comparable guitars is in its configuration variations. While it shares their dual pickup, single cutaway style with the more popular Gibson Les Paul, the 6128 Duo Jet models take various unique approaches for shaping the tonality of the instrument.

While a master volume is standard on this model, some variations will either have independent neck/bridge pickup volume knobs with a master tone knob, or will have the same independent neck/bridge pickup volume knobs, but with a tone switch next to the pickup selector switch instead of the master tone knob.

The versions with a master tone knob are equipped with DeArmond Dynasonic pickups, which have a full-bodied, low frequency tone. Most associated with the sound of guitarist Duane Eddy, Dynasonics are single coil pickups, and have been used on certain Gretsch models since the 1950s. Most models of the guitar come equipped with a Bigsby vibrato tailpiece in conjunction with a rocker bridge.

The most famous example of this Duo Jet was played by George Harrison during The Beatles' early days in Hamburg, and on their first album. Harrison also posed with the guitar for the cover of his 1987 solo album, Cloud Nine.

The tone switch versions of the Duo Jet come equipped with Gretsch's own Filtertron humbucker pickup made popular by country music guitarist Chet Atkins, and are still in demand to this day. Notable players of this version include David Gilmour of Pink Floyd as well as George Harrison.

Variations
 G6128 – Filtertron pickups, no Bigsby tailpiece
 G6128T – Bigsby and Filtertron pickups
 G6128T-DS – Bigsby and Dynasonic pickups, Rosewood fingerboard, originally based on 1957 version, currently based on 1955 version
 G6128-DS – Dynasonic pickups, no bigsby, Rosewood fingerboard
 G6128T-DCM – Bigsby and Filtertron pickups, Double Cut-away, Dark Cherry Metallic, Ebony Fretboard
 G6128-1962 – Double cutaway version of the Duo Jet, equipped with Bigsby and Filtertron pickups
 G6128T59 – Bigsby and TV Jones classic pickups (Vintage Select '59 Duo Jet edition)
 G6128TCG – Bigsby and Dynasonic pickups, in a Cadillac Green finish with Gold hardware
 G6128TVP – aka the "Power Jet" Pickups are upgraded to TV Jones Power'Trons
 G6128T-TVP – Bigsby equipped version of the Power Jet
 G6128T 6 12 – Double-necked six- and twelve-string guitar with 4 Filtertron pickups.
 G6128T-GH – Custom shop and standard versions of George Harrison's Duo Jet. The custom shop version is designed and built to appear like George Harrison's original appears today. Standard version has the color scheme of Harrison's guitar and features his signature on truss-rod cover. Both versions include all black body and moved bottom strap pin.
 G6128T-CLFG - Cliff Gallup Signature Duo Jet. Cliff Gallup kept his guitar stock, so this version is essentially a custom shop replica of a '54 Duo Jet.
 G6128B - "Thunder Jet" bass version with TV Jones Thunder'Tron pickups

Other versions
"Silver Jet"
 G6129 – topped with silver sparkle drum material. Same features as the standard G6128 Duo Jet
 G6129T – equipped with Bigsby
 G6129-1957 – Rosewood finger board, Dynasonic pickups, and no Bigsby
 G6219T-1957 – Rosewood finger board, Dyansonic pickups, with Bigsby
 G6219T-1962 – Double cutaway version, with Bigsby and Filtertrons

"Round Up"
 G6130 – Orange stain, leather bound with western motif carved into the leather, G Branded body, Dynasonic pickups, gold hardware, Rosewood fretboard, no Bigsby

"Jet Firebird"
 G6131 – Duo Jet in Fire Red finish, with Filtertrons, no Bigsby
 G6131T – Fire Red, with Bigsby and Filtertron pickups
 G6131TVP – "Power Jet" version with TV Jones Power'Tron pickups, pinned bridge, Schaller strap locks
 G6131T-TVP – "Power Jet" version with TV Jones Power'Tron pickups, pinned bridge, Sperzel locking tuners, Schaller strap locks, and a Bigsby tailpiece

Rock Band controller
A replica of George Harrison's Duo Jet is the basis for a guitar controller for The Beatles: Rock Band.

References

External links
G6128T Duo Jet at Zuitar Guitar DataBase

6128
Semi-acoustic guitars
The Beatles' musical instruments